North Roscoe Township is a township in Hodgeman County, Kansas, USA.  As of the 2000 census, its population was 51.

Geography
According to the USGS, it contains one cemetery, “Kidderville”.

The streams of Cottonwood Creek, Hackberry Creek, Plum Creek and Sand Creek run through this township.

References
 USGS Geographic Names Information System (GNIS)

External links
 US-Counties.com
 City-Data.com

Townships in Hodgeman County, Kansas
Townships in Kansas